Federico Marchesi (born 8 February 1999) is an Italian professional footballer who plays as a midfielder for  club Pro Sesto.

Club career
He made one appearance for Milan on 8 October 2016 in a friendly game against Chiasso.

He made his Serie C debut for Pro Piacenza on 23 September 2018 in a game against Alessandria.

On 24 January 2019, Monza announced the acquisition of Federico Marchesi on a free from Pro Piacenza. On 9 July 2019, he was loaned to Lecco.

On 21 September 2020, Marchesi joined Pro Sesto on a permanent deal.

References

External links
 
 

1999 births
Living people
Footballers from Bergamo
Italian footballers
Association football midfielders
Serie C players
A.C. Milan players
S.S. Lazio players
A.S. Pro Piacenza 1919 players
A.C. Monza players
Calcio Lecco 1912 players
S.S.D. Pro Sesto players